Kevin Connor (born 1932, Sydney), Australian artist who won the Archibald Prize twice; in 1975 for The Hon Sir Frank Kitto, KBE, and in 1977 for Robert Klippel. He won the Sulman Prize in 1991/92 with Najaf (Iraq) June 1991 and again in 1997 with The Man with itchy fingers and other figures Gare du Nord.

He won a Harkness Fellowship for 21 months in the United States in 1966. He won the inaugural Dobell Prize in 1992 with Pyrmont and the city, and also won it in 2005 with Le Grand Palais, Clémenceau, de Gaulle and me.
He was a finalist in the 1994 Archibald Prize and also in the 2010 Archibald Prize.

Portrait
A portrait of Kevin Connor by Danelle Bergstrom was exhibited in the Archibald Prize in 2006

References

External links
Liverpool Street Gallery 

Australian painters
Archibald Prize winners
1932 births
Living people
Abstract expressionist artists
Neo-expressionist artists